Ysyk-Ata District is one of the eight districts of the Chüy Region in northern Kyrgyzstan with an area of . The district's resident population was 154,340 in 2021. Since 1998, when the former Kant District was merged into Ysyk-Ata District, the administrative center of the district is the city of Kant. The district is located on the southern side of the river Chüy, about halfway between the national capital Bishkek and the former regional capital Tokmok.

Air force base and school 

In 1941, a Soviet Air Force base and pilot training school were set up in the district. During World War II, 1507 military pilots were trained there. Since 1956, the school trained foreign pilots; among its graduates were both the ex-Egyptian president Hosni Mubarak and the late Syrian president Hafez Assad.

In 1992, the air base was transferred to Kyrgyzstan authorities;  since 2003 it hosts Russian Air Force units.

Water erosion 
The district authorities, as well as the residents of the riverside village of Milyanfan, are concerned with the river Chüy gradually washing away the district's land, as it shifts its course to the south and erodes its left (southern) bank.

Demographics
As of 2009, Ysyk-Ata District included 1 town, and 58 villages in 18 rural communities. Its de facto population, according to the Population and Housing Census of 2009, was 131,503, and de jure population 132,759. Some 21,762 people live in urban areas, and 109,741 in rural ones.

Ethnic composition
According to the 2009 Census, the ethnic composition of Ysyk-Ata District (de jure population) was:

Populated places
In total, Ysyk-Ata District includes 1 town and 56 settlements in 18 rural communities. Each rural community can consist of one or several villages. The rural communities and settlements in Ysyk-Ata District are:

 city Kant
 Ak-Kuduk (seat: Kirov; incl. Ak-Kuduk, Kotovsky, Birinchi May and Khun Chi (partly))
 Birdik (seat: Birdik; incl. Khun Chi (partly))
 Internatsional (seat: Internatsional; incl. Jar-Bashy)
 Ivanovka (seat: Ivanovka)
 Jeek (seat: Dmitriyevka; incl. Gagarin and Jeek)
 Keng-Bulung (seat: Keng-Bulung; incl. Gidrostroitel, Druzhba and Cholpon)
 Kochkorbaev (seat: Kengesh; incl. Budennovka and Dokturbek Kurmanaliev)
 Krasnaya Rechka (seat: Krasnaya Rechka)
 Logvinenko (seat: Novopokrovka (partly); incl. Chong-Daly)
 Lyuksemburg (seat: Lyuksemburg; incl. Kirshelk)
 Milyanfan (seat: Milyanfan)
 Novopokrovka (seat: Novopokrovka (partly); incl. Lenin and Sary-Jon)
 Nurmanbet (seat: Nurmanbet; incl. Birinchi May and Aliaskar Toktonaliev)
 Syn-Tash (seat: Telman; incl. Ak-Say, Jetigen, Kyzyl-Aryk, Ötögön, Rot-Front, Sovet and Syn-Tash)
 Tuz (seat: Tuz; incl. Dayyrbek, Jayalma and Tömönkü Serafimovka)
 Uzun-Kyr (seat: Jer-Kazar; incl. Druzhba and Tömönkü Norus)
 Yuryevka (seat: Yuryevka; incl. Ysyk-Ata)
 Ysyk-Ata (seat: Almaluu; incl. Gornaya Serafimovka, Jogorku-Ichke-Suu, Ichke-Suu, Karagay-Bulak, Norus, Tash-Bashat, Toguz-Bulak and Üch-Emchek)

Notable people 

 Kakish Ryskulova - first central asian woman to become a surgeon.

References

External links 

 Ysyk-Ata District data at the regional administration web site. 

Districts of Chüy Region